Wittenberge station is the railway station for the Brandenburg town of Wittenberge in Germany. About 5,000 passengers use the station daily and it is served by around 100 trains per day.

Infrastructure 
The station is located about 1.3 kilometres from the city centre on the eastern edge of the town of Wittenberge. The entrance building and the main platform are accessible from the west over several directly abutting streets. Following an extensive rebuild in 2004, the station now has a 55 centimetre high and 375 metre long home platform as well as two island platforms 405 metres in length and 76 centimetres in height. Another part of the platform, which is approximately 60 metre-long, lies to the south, but it is not directly connected to the through tracks.

Two island platforms, each with a length of 405 m and a height of 76 cm, extend towards the north from the centre of the entrance building. They are connected to the main platform by a 65 m long underpass.

Barrier-free accessibility is provided by a wheelchair ramp next to the three sets of steps down to the road-side at the entrance building and to the island platforms are reached by lifts beside the access steps.

History 
The station was built in 1846 at kilometre post 126 on the Berlin-Hamburg Railway. In 1851 the Wittenberge–Stendal line was opened. That made Wittenberge station into the most important railway hub between Berlin and Hamburg. The station building of this Keilbahnhof ("wedge station", i.e. situated between the two converging lines of a junction) was located between the western approach tracks of the Magdeburg route and the eastern approach tracks on the Berlin-Hamburg Railway.

From 1870 trains also ran from here on a branch of the Berlin-Hamburg Railway, that led over the river Elbe near Dömitz and via Dannenberg to Buchholz.

Upgrade 

Wittenberge station was comprehensively refurbished as part of the upgrade of the Berlin-Hamburg Railway in 2000. It lost its status as an island station, as all the tracks are now on the eastern side of the station building. The so-called Magdeburg Side lost its tracks, the line from Stendal being re-routed south of the building on the Berlin Side. The number of tracks was also significantly reduced.

The refurbishment required 280,000 tonnes of earth to be moved, around 22 kilometres track to be replaced, 120 points to be removed, 42 points to be installed and 32 kilometres of catenary to be replaced. The running speed through the station was raised from 30 to 160 km/h; an increase to 197 km/h, which was also considered, would have required the control of active tilting technology by the train safety system, LZB, but this was not put into practice. A total of seven million euros was invested.

The opening of the rebuilt station took place on 24 August 2004 in the presence of the German chancellor,  Gerhard Schröder.

Transport links 
Long-distance services are provided by five InterCity/EuroCity pairs of trains between Berlin/Dresden or Hamburg on workdays and an IC train pair between Rostock and Leipzig. One or two ICE trains stop at the station during the daily rush hours, but most pass through without stopping.

Local rail services in Wittenberge are provided by two Brandenburg Regional-Express services: line RE 2 (Ludwigsfelde/Luckenwalde–Wittenberge/Wismar) and line RE 6 (Berlin-Spandau–Hennigsdorf–Pritzwalk-Wittenberge). In addition a Regionalbahn (RB) service, contracted by the state of Saxony-Anhalt, runs on the Wittenberge - Magdeburg route.

In the 2016 timetable the following lines stop at the station:

References

Railway stations in Brandenburg
Monuments and memorials in Germany
Buildings and structures in Prignitz
Neoclassical architecture in Germany
Railway stations in Germany opened in 1846
1846 establishments in Prussia